Michael Benjamin Washington (born June 7, 1979) is an American actor known for his roles in American Auto, 100 Questions, Unbreakable Kimmy Schmidt. He has also performed in Broadway productions of The Boys in the Band, Funny Girl, Mamma Mia!, La Cage aux Folles, and others.

Filmography

Film

Television

References 

Living people
American actors
Actors from Dallas
American gay actors
Male actors from Dallas
1979 births
Tisch School of the Arts alumni
New York University alumni

African-American male actors